Vladimir Dubov (born 20 February 1988) is a freestyle wrestler from Bulgaria. He competes in the 60 kg division and won the silver medal in the same division at the 2013 European Wrestling Championships. He repeated his success at the 2013 World Wrestling Championships.

In March 2021, he competed at the European Qualification Tournament in Budapest, Hungary hoping to qualify for the 2020 Summer Olympics in Tokyo, Japan.

He competed in the 65kg event at the 2022 World Wrestling Championships held in Belgrade, Serbia.

References

External links 
 

1988 births
Living people
Bulgarian male sport wrestlers
European Games competitors for Bulgaria
World Wrestling Championships medalists
Olympic wrestlers of Bulgaria
Wrestlers at the 2016 Summer Olympics
European Wrestling Championships medalists